WHAT ARE YOU DOING HERE? A Black Woman's Life and Liberation in Heavy Metal is a non-fiction book written by the Canadian journalist Laina Dawes. First published in 2013, the book explores how black women musicians and fans navigate the metal, hardcore, and punk music genres that are regularly thought of as inclusive spaces and centered on a community spirit, but fail to block out the race and gender issues that exist in the outside world. It features a foreword by Skin of Skunk Anansie.

References

External links

Laina Dawes interview on NPR
Book review by Publishers Weekly

2013 non-fiction books
Music books
Bazillion Points books